The Environment Act 1995 (c 25), passed under the ministerial tutelage of John Gummer, is a United Kingdom Act of Parliament which created a number of new agencies and set new standards for environmental management.

See also
English land law
UK environmental law
Hedgerows Regulations 1997

External links

United Kingdom Acts of Parliament 1995
Environmental law in the United Kingdom
Waste legislation in the United Kingdom
1995 in British law
1995 in the environment